Del Monte Forest (Del Monte, Spanish for "of the mountain") is a census-designated place (CDP) in Monterey County, California. As of the 2020 census, the CDP had a total population of 4,204, down from 4,514 at the 2010 census. The census area includes the separate well-known community of Pebble Beach. 

The Del Monte Forest is a habitat area of the same location, which originally occupied considerably more area prior to urban development of the 20th century. The forest is dominated by Monterey pine, but also contains other important tree species and a variety of rare and endangered plant species.

Geography and ecology
Del Monte Forest is located in northwestern Monterey County at 36°35'11" North, 121°56'51" West. It occupies the western half of the Monterey Peninsula and is bordered to the east by the city of Montery and to the north by the city of Pacific Grove. The city of Carmel-by-the-Sea is to the south. Pebble Beach is in the southern part of the CDP.

The total area is 24.55% water.

The community is a habitat for a number of limited range and endangered species.

History
The Del Monte Forest was originally part of the resort complex of the Hotel Del Monte in Monterey. The resort hotel was built by Charles Crocker, one of California's Big Four railroad barons, through Southern Pacific Railroad's property division, the Pacific Improvement Company (PIC). The hotel first opened on June 10, 1880. Samuel Finley Brown Morse formed the Del Monte Properties Company on February 27, 1919, and acquired the extensive holdings of the PIC, which included the Del Monte Forest, the Del Monte Lodge (since renamed the Lodge at Pebble Beach) and the Hotel Del Monte. The actual hotel building and surrounding grounds were acquired by the United States Navy after World War II to be the Navy's new location of the Naval Postgraduate School.

Demographics

2010
The 2010 United States Census reported that Del Monte Forest had a population of 4,514. The racial makeup of Del Monte Forest was 3,922 (86.9%) White, 43 (1.0%) African American, 10 (0.2%) Native American, 388 (8.6%) Asian, 3 (0.1%) Pacific Islander, 57 (1.3%) from other races, and 91 (2.0%) from two or more races. Hispanic or Latino of any race were 167 persons (3.7%).

The Census reported that 4,172 people (92.4% of the population) lived in households, 321 (7.1%) lived in non-institutionalized group quarters, and 21 (0.5%) were institutionalized.

There were 1,925 households, out of which 309 (16.1%) had children under the age of 18 living in them, 1,215 (63.1%) were opposite-sex married couples living together, 96 (5.0%) had a female householder with no husband present, 41 (2.1%) had a male householder with no wife present. There were 45 (2.3%) unmarried opposite-sex partnerships, and 18 (0.9%) same-sex married couples or partnerships. 468 households (24.3%) were made up of individuals, and 310 (16.1%) had someone living alone who was 65 years of age or older. The average household size was 2.17. There were 1,352 families (70.2% of all households); the average family size was 2.53.

The population was spread out, with 748 people (16.6%) under the age of 18, 213 people (4.7%) aged 18 to 24, 541 people (12.0%) aged 25 to 44, 1,449 people (32.1%) aged 45 to 64, and 1,563 people (34.6%) who were 65 years of age or older. The median age was 57.8 years. For every 100 females, there were 92.6 males. For every 100 females age 18 and over, there were 90.0 males.

The homeowner vacancy rate was 4.0%; the rental vacancy rate was 5.4%. 3,372 people (74.7% of the population) lived in owner-occupied housing units and 800 people (17.7%) lived in rental housing units.

2000
As of the census of 2000, there were 4,531 people, 2,092 households, and 1,456 families residing in the CDP. The racial makeup of the CDP was 91.37% White, 0.40% African American, 0.26% Native American, 5.25% Asian, 0.18% Pacific Islander, 0.88% from other races, and 1.66% from two or more races. 2.34% of the population were Hispanic or Latino of any race.

There were 2,092 households, out of which 14.9% had children under the age of 18 living with them, 63.7% were married couples living together, 4.7% had a female householder with no husband present, and 30.4% were non-families. 24.8% of all households were made up of individuals, and 16.9% had someone living alone who was 65 years of age or older. The average household size was 2.17 and the average family size was 2.52.

The age distribution was 12.8% under the age of 18, 3.1% from 18 to 24, 12.6% from 25 to 44, 35.6% from 45 to 64, and 35.9% who were 65 years of age or older. The median age was 57 years. For every 100 females, there were 86.7 males. For every 100 females age 18 and over, there were 85.4 males.

The median income for a household in the CDP was $99,788, and the median income for a family was $112,741. Males had a median income of $79,431 versus $44,707 for females. The per capita income for the CDP was $70,609. 2.3% of the population and 1.8% of families were below the poverty line. Out of the total population, 4.2% of those under the age of 18 and 2.5% of those 65 and older were living below the poverty line.

Government
At the county level, Del Monte Forest is represented on the Monterey County Board of Supervisors by Supervisor Dave Potter.

Environmental features
The Monterey Pine forest is habitat to numerous rare and endangered species including Hickman's potentilla and Yadon's piperia, both of which are federally protected species.

See also
Cypress forest
Pebble Beach, an unincorporated community within the census-defined area.

References

External links
Del Monte Forest Conservancy
Del Monte Forest Property Owners

Census-designated places in Monterey County, California
Census-designated places in California
Populated coastal places in California